The 2007 Utah Utes football team represented the University of Utah in the 2007 NCAA Division I FBS football season. The team was coached by third-year head football coach Kyle Whittingham. The Utes played their homes games in Rice-Eccles Stadium.

Preseason

Recruiting

Schedule

Game summaries

Oregon State

The Utes and Beavers kicked off the 2007 college football season playing in the first game of the year. For the Utes, this game marked the long-awaited return of QB Brian Johnson, who sat out the 2006 on a medical red-shirt,  and the debut of highly touted Junior College All-American transfer, RB Matt Asiata. Unfortunately, both Asiata and Johnson would suffer serious injuries that altered the season for the Utes. After only 4 carries, Matt Asiata's season ended when his leg was broken near the end of the 1st quarter. Brian Johnson threw a 36-yard touchdown pass to Brent Casteel to take the lead moments later, but was injured as well near the end of the first half suffering a separated shoulder that would take him out of the game and on to the sideline. Utah's offense was never able to put together a consistent drive and left their defense on the field for the majority of the game. Oregon State's offensive line and senior RB Yvenson Bernard took advantage of a fatigued Ute defense, racking up 165 yards rushing and 2 TDs on 29 carries.

Oregon State Leads Series: 9 – 4 – 1

Air Force

In the conference opener for both teams, Utah's injury woes would continue against the falcons as junior WR Brent Casteel suffered a torn ACL which ended his season while Air force accumulated 334 rushing yards and controlled most of the game. In the final moments, Utah found themselves down 20–12 on the Air Force 1-yard line. On 3rd-and-goal, Freshman RB Eddie Wide took a direct snap through the middle of the line only to be taken down for no gain. With time running down to under a minute to go the final chance to score came on 4th down. Darryl Poston took a hand-off to the right side of the line and was met by a swarm of Air Force defenders who stopped him just a couple feet short of the goal-line. Utah was handed their 2nd defeat of the season and began 0–2 for the first time since 2000.

Air Force Leads Series: 14 – 10 – 0

UCLA

Having started the 2007 season 0–2, the Utes were off to their worst start since 2000, and with their starting QB, RB and star WR out to injury, their luck did not look like it was about to change against the #11 UCLA Bruins. The game started off with both teams scoring on their first possessions, Utah on a 53-yard touchdown pass from backup QB Tommy Grady to WR Marquis Wilson, and UCLA on a 45-yard field goal by Kai Forbath. The 2nd quarter was more of the same with Forbath kicking another 3 points onto the scoreboard for the Bruins from 52-yards out, and Grady finding RB Darrell Mack on a 12-yard touchdown pass just before the end of the 1st half.

Trailing 14–6 midway through the 3rd quarter it looked as though UCLA was about to get closer to the lead the Utes held when UCLA QB Ben Olson found a wide open Marcus Everett  who looked to be on his way to the end-zone for a 52-yard touchdown reception. Ute safety, Robert Johnson caught up to Everett and hit him before he crossed the goal-line causing him to fumble the ball through the back of the end-zone for a touchback. "That really killed any momentum we had gained", said UCLA coach Karl Dorrell. The Utes took possession and dominated the rest of the game with the help of their defense forcing 5 total turnovers and keeping the Bruins scoreless throughout the 2nd half. RB Darrell Mack ended the game with 107-yards rushing on 19 carries, becoming the first Ute running back to rush for 100-yards in a single game since Quinton Ganther in the 2005 Emerald Bowl. This was the Utes' first win over the Bruins.

UCLA Leads Series: 8 – 1 – 0

UNLV

Coming off of one of the biggest wins in school history, the Utes next faced UNLV. Utah's offense struggled the entire game turning the ball over 4 times and never scored, being shut-out for the first time since 1993. Like their match against Oregon State, the Ute defense was dominated by a strong Rebel running attack.  UNLV RB Frank Summers rushed for 190-yards and 2 TDs on 29 carries leading the way to the Rebel's first win over the Utes since 1979.

Utah Leads Series: 11 – 2 – 0

Utah State

Utah State gave the Utes a scare, scoring first after Brian Johnson's pass to Jereme Brooks was taken away by James Brindley for an interception. Brooks would later redeem himself, catching his first career touchdown pass from Johnson, tying the game at 7 at the end of the first quarter. The Ute defense stopped the Aggies on their next possession, forcing them to punt. Derek Richards took the punt and returned it for a touchdown, the first punt returned for a score since Steve Smith against California in 2000. Utah would not trail again as Darrell Mack racked up 132-yards rushing and a TD on 26 carries. This victory marked the Utes' tenth straight against their oldest rival.

Utah Leads Series: 75 – 28 – 4

Louisville

Utah Leads Series: 3 – 0 – 0

San Diego State

Utah Leads Series: 14 – 12 – 1

TCU

Utah Leads Series: 4 – 1 – 0

Colorado State

Utah Leads Series: 52 – 22 – 1

Wyoming

Utah Leads Series: 48 – 31 – 1

New Mexico

Utah Leads Series: 30 – 17 – 2

Brigham Young

This rivalry game, unofficially dubbed "The Holy War," is typically the most anticipated conference game for each of these two teams.  In 2006, the rivalry was ranked in the Wall Street Journal as the 4th best college football rivalry game in the country.

The game was largely a defensive struggle until the last few minutes of the fourth quarter. The Utes took the lead 10–9 when Darrell Mack scored the first touchdown of the game with just 1:34 left. On the ensuing possession, however, BYU converted on fourth and eighteen from their own 12 with a 49-yard pass from Max Hall to Austin Collie.  Harvey Unga made the game-winning touchdown run with 38 seconds remaining, and Austin Collie caught a pass in the back of the end zone for a two-point conversion, putting the Cougars up 17–10.  Unga became BYU's first freshman running back to gain 1,000 rushing yards in a season.  This was also Collie's 6th game for over 97 yards receiving.  BYU racked up 424 offensive yards to Utah's 244.  Unga was named the MWC Offensive Player of the Week, and freshman kicker, Mitch Payne, was named MWC Special Teams Player of the Week making 3 of 4 field goals.

Utah Leads Series: 52 – 33 – 4

Navy

Utah started this game looking for their seventh straight bowl win since 1999. They did just that, led by Quarterback Brian Johnson, who threw and ran for a touchdown to lead the Utes to a 35–32 win. He finished the day going 20–25 for 226 yards and the two touchdowns. Running back Darrell Mack ran for 76 yards on 22 carries and 2 touchdowns. The Midshipmen were led by Quarterback Kaipo-Noa Kaheaku-Enhada who went 7–14 for 122 yards, 2 touchdowns and just 1 interception. Fullback Eric Kettani carried the ball 12 times for 125 yards and 1 touchdown. Utah struck first on a 5-yard Mack run in the 2nd quarter. The Midshipmen then proceeded to score 17 straight points with 11:52 to play in the 3rd quarter. The Utes then struck back with three straight touchdowns including Brian Johnson's 19 yard scramble with 12:47 to go in the fourth quarter to make it 28–17 in favor of the Utes. Kaheaku-Enhada then hooked up with Shun White for a 10-yard pass that made it 28–25. Mack then had a 1-yard run to make it 35–25 with 1:27 to play. Kaheaku-Enhada then found Zerbin Singleton with 00:57 to play to make it 35–32. Navy then converted the onside kick. Utah safety Joe Dale then intercepted Kaheaku-Enhada to seal the Ute win.

Utah Leads Series: 1 – 0 – 0

The Beehive Boot

"The Beehive Boot, which signifies instate football supremacy, was conceived in 1971. The authentic pioneer boot is awarded annually to the Utah school with the best record against its instate NCAA Division I foes. The schools who compete for the boot are Utah, Brigham Young and Utah State. In its 32-year history, the Beehive Boot has been awarded to Utah 10 times (1978, 1988, 1993, '94, '95, '99, 2002, 03, 04, and 05)."

2007 Utah Utes

Roster

Statistical Leaders

References

Utah
Utah Utes football seasons
Poinsettia Bowl champion seasons
Utah Utes football